De Gyldne Laurbær (English: The Golden Laurel) (earlier: Boghandlernes Gyldne Laurbær) is a Danish literature award, which was established in 1949. The award is handed by The Committee De Gyldne Laurbær, formerly Boghandlerklubben (The Bookshops' Club). The prize is given annually in February or March. Originally the award was a laurel wreath, a golden pin with an inscription, some money and a book gift worth 2500 DKK. Today the award is a laurel wreathe, a diploma and a book gift worth 2500 DKK. The award is handed at a ceremony arranged by the publishing house which has published the winning book and by the Committee De Gyldne Laurbær. Early in January every year the committee sends out ballot to all the Danish bookshops, which then give their vote for a Danish book which was published the year before. An author can only win The Golden Laurel once-in-a-lifetime, so the bookshops can not vote for an author who has already won the prize once before. The winner is usually one of the bestsellers among the Danish books. On the day when it is decided who wins the Golden Laurel, the president of the Committee of The Golden Laurel informs the winner about the award, while journalists follow the event.

Recipients 
 1949 – Martin A. Hansen for Tanker i en skorsten
 1950 – Hans Christian Branner for Rytteren
 1951 – Jacob Paludan for Retur til barndommen
 1952 – Karen Blixen for Babettes gæstebud
 1953 – Aage Dons for Altid at spørge
 1954 – Tom Kristensen
 1955 – Tove Ditlevsen
 1956 – 
 1957 – Halfdan Rasmussen
 1958 – Frank Jæger
 1959 – 
 1960 – 
 1961 – Marcus Lauesen
 1962 – 
 1963 – 
 1964 – Erik Aalbæk Jensen
 1965 – Thorkild Hansen
 1966 – Klaus Rifbjerg for Operaelskeren
 1967 – 
 1968 – Anders Bodelsen
 1969 – Inger Christensen for Det
 1970 – Leif Panduro
 1971 –  for Løgn over løgn
 1972 – Christian Kampmann
 1973 – Anna Ladegaard
 1974 – Benny Andersen
 1975 – 
 1976 – Dea Trier Mørch
 1977 – 
 1978 – Vita Andersen for Hold kæft og vær smuk
 1979 – Johannes Møllehave for Læsehest med æselører
 1980 – Tage Skou-Hansen
 1981 – Suzanne Brøgger for Tone
 1982 – Kirsten Thorup
 1983 – Dorrit Willumsen
 1984 – Cecil Bødker for Marias Barn. Drengen and Marias Barn. Manden
 1985 – Helle Stangerup for Christine
 1986 – Paul Hammerich for Lysmageren 1987 – Martha Christensen for Dansen med Regitze 1988 – Bjarne Reuter for Den cubanske kabale 1989 – Ib Michael for  1990 – Peter Seeberg for Om fjorten dage 1991 – Leif Davidsen for Den sidste spion 1992 – Lise Nørgaard for Kun en pige 1993 – Peter Høeg for De måske egnede 1994 – Jørn Riel for Cirkulæret og andre skrøner 1995 – Henrik Nordbrandt for Ormene ved himlens port 1996 – Carsten Jensen for Jeg har set verden begynde 1997 – Jane Aamund for Colorado drømme 1998 – Jens Christian Grøndahl for Lucca 1999 – Svend Åge Madsen for Genspejlet 2000 –  for Kærlighedens rum 2001 – Hans Edvard Nørregård-Nielsen for Riber Ret 2002 – Jakob Ejersbo for Nordkraft 2003 –  for  2004 – Christian Jungersen for  2005 –  for  2006 –  for  2007 –  for  2008 – Hanne-Vibeke Holst for Dronningeofret 2009 – Ida Jessen for the novel Børnene 2010 – Jussi Adler-Olsen for the novel  2011 – Helle Helle for the novel Dette burde skrives i nutidDansk.ru Helle Helle Wins Golden Laurel (Translated into English from an article in the Danish paper Berlingske Tidende)
 2012 – Kim Leine for the novel Profeterne i Evighedsfjorden 2013 –  for the novel Forbandede yngel 2014 – Sara Blædel for the novel Kvinden de meldte savnet 2015 –  for the novel Aisha 2016 –  for the novel Folkets skønhed 2017 –  for the novel En anden gren 2018 –  for the novel  2019 – Sara Omar for the novel Skyggedanseren 2020 – Stine Pilgaard for the novel Meter i sekundet 2021 – Thomas Korsgaard for the novel Man skulle nok have været der 2022 – Maren Uthaug for the novel 11%''

References

External links 
 List of recipients of the prize De Gyldne Laurbær on Boghandlerklubben.dk

1949 establishments in Denmark
Awards established in 1949
Danish literary awards